Trapania miltabrancha is a species of sea slug, a dorid nudibranch, a marine gastropod mollusc in the family Goniodorididae.

Distribution
This species was first described from Bali. It has subsequently been reported from the Philippines.

Description
This goniodorid nudibranch has a complicated colour pattern. The body is a mosaic of brown patches which contain white spots, interspersed with orange. The rhinophores, lateral papillae and gills are cream with brown patches.

Ecology
Trapania miltabrancha feeds on Entoprocta which often grow on sponges, algae and other living substrata.

References

Goniodorididae
Gastropods described in 2008